Germán Rojas can refer to:
Germán Rojas (politician), Paraguayan politician
Germán Rojas (footballer) (born 1979), Spanish footballer